"Raplaulajan vapaapäivä" is a song by Finnish rapper Cheek featuring Brädi & Pappa. Released in 2004, the song serves as the second single from Cheek's first studio album Avaimet mun kulmille. "Raplaulajan vapaapäivä" peaked at number six on the Finnish Singles Chart.

Chart performance

References

2004 singles
Cheek (rapper) songs
2004 songs
Sony Music singles